The Bosnia and Herzegovina national under-16 and under-17 basketball team is the national representative for Bosnia and Herzegovina in international under-18 and under-19 basketball competitions. They are organized by the Basketball Federation of Bosnia and Herzegovina. The team competes at the FIBA U16 European Championship, with the opportunity to qualify for the FIBA Under-17 World Cup.

FIBA U16 European Championship
On 27 July 2007, in the first game of the Division B 2007 FIBA U16 European Championship, Bosnia and Herzegovina defeated Armenia by the score of 236–27, becoming one of the highest margin wins ever in any international game.

Bosnia and Herzegovina won two gold medals in 2015, winning both the 2015 European Youth Summer Olympic Festival as well as the 2015 FIBA U16 European Championship.  Winning the European Under-16 Championship caused massive celebrations throughout the streets of Bosnia.  

On 17 August 2015 in Sarajevo, close to 50,000 Bosnia and Herzegovina national team supporters welcomed the under-16 European champions home.

FIBA Under-17 World Cup

See also
Bosnia and Herzegovina national basketball team
Bosnia and Herzegovina national under-20 basketball team
Bosnia and Herzegovina national under-18 and under-19 basketball team

References

External links
Official website (in Bosnian)
FIBA profile

 
Men's national under-16 basketball teams
Men's national under-17 basketball teams